Anton Woensam (c.1493/1496 – c.1541) was a German painter and wood-engraver.

Woensam was "probably" trained by his father Jaspar as a painter. He mainly created book illustrations.

He relocated from Worms to Cologne in about 1510. 

His work is in the permanent collection of the National Gallery of Art, Washington DC, US.

References

1490s births
1540s deaths
German artists
German wood engravers
German illustrators
People from Worms, Germany